Svein Erik Nordang (born November 17, 1968) is a Norwegian businessperson and broker.

He was the chief executive officer of Terra Securities until it filed for bankruptcy on 28 November 2007 due to loss of all concession from the Financial Supervisory Authority of Norway due to the Terra Securities scandal. He was hired in Terra Securities in 2001, and was promoted to CEO in 2006.

He lives in Oslo.

References

1968 births
Living people
Norwegian bankers
Eika Gruppen